Salomé is a 19th-century painting by French artist Henri Regnault. Done in oil on canvas, the work depicts the biblical character Salome. The work debuted in the Paris salon of 1870, several months before Regnault was killed in the Franco-Prussian War. The work has been in the collection of the Metropolitan Museum of Art since 1916.

References 

1870 paintings
Paintings in the collection of the Metropolitan Museum of Art
Orientalist paintings